The Punta del Este ePrix is an annual race of the single-seater, electrically powered Formula E championship, held in Punta del Este, Uruguay. It was first raced in the 2014–15 season.

Circuit
The Punta del Este ePrix is held on the Punta del Este Street Circuit. It runs along Punta del Este's harbour and is based on a former TC2000 circuit.

Results

Repeat winners (drivers)

References

External links

 
Punta del Este
Recurring sporting events established in 2014
2014 establishments in Uruguay